The 2005 FIA WTCC Race Of Spain was the ninth and penultimate round of the 2005 World Touring Car Championship season. It was held at the Circuit Ricardo Tormo. Jordi Gené won the first race for SEAT, this being SEAT's third win and the first for the new SEAT León in WTCC. The second race was dominated by Jörg Müller, whose win for BMW helped them to close in on the Manufacturers Championship.

Race 1

Race 2

Standings after the races

Drivers' Championship standings

Manufacturers' Championship standings

References

External links

2005 World Touring Car Championship season
Race